Stefan Schwendinger (born 24 July 1994) is an Austrian footballer who currently plays as a midfielder for Austria Klagenfurt.

External links

1994 births
Living people
Austrian footballers
Association football midfielders
FC Liefering players
Wolfsberger AC players
SK Austria Klagenfurt players